Handiwork is the seventh studio album by the Canadian guitarist Rik Emmett, released in 2002. It is the second fully instrumental album recorded by Emmett.

Track listing
 "Full Sail" – 4:04
 "Steady Burn" – 4:23
 "Two Jigs" – 2:16
 "The Long Line" – 3:50
 "Libre Animado" – 3:18
 "Knuckleball Sandwich" – 3:09
 "Autumn Turns" – 4:59
 "All Thumbs" – 1:49
 "Twilight" – 6:52
 "Once upon a Time" – 3:36
 "Another Rainbow (For Pat)" – 4:04

Personnel
 Rik Emmett – Guitars, Synthesizers
 Dave Dunlop – Guitars
 Steve Skingley – Acoustic Bass
 Pat Kilbride – Electric Bass
 Randy Cooke – Percussion
 Marty Anderson – Keyboards

Production
 Rik Emmett – producer
 Ed Stone – engineer
 Hugh Cooper – mixing
 Noel Golden – assistant engineer
 George Graves – mastering
 Chris Chapman – Photography

External links
 Handiwork Entry at the Official Rik Emmett Homepage

Rik Emmett albums
2002 albums
Open House Records albums
Instrumental albums